Kleier is a surname. Notable people with the surname include:

Alan Kleier, American engineer and businessman
Roger Kleier (born 1958), American composer, guitarist, improviser, and producer
Sean Kleier (born 1987), American actor

See also
Kleiber
Kleiner